The 1984 South American Basketball Championship for Women was the 19th regional tournament for women in South America. It was held in Cúcuta, Colombia and won by the local squad. Eight teams competed.

Results

Each team played the other teams twice, for a total of eight games played by each team.

External links
FIBA Archive

1984
1984 in women's basketball
International women's basketball competitions hosted by Colombia
1984 in Colombian sport
Cúcuta
October 1984 sports events in South America